Revée Walcott-Nolan (born 6 March 1995) is a British athlete, known for being the 1500m British Champion in 2021, and competing for Britain in the 2020 Tokyo Olympics.

From Luton, and an attendee at Bedford Girls' School until 2013, she has said she was inspired by her grandmother into athletics. She has run for Woodford Green Essex Ladies as well as the Newham & Essex Beagles and has been at Luton AC since a teenager. She graduated from St Mary’s University, Twickenham with a degree in sports science in 2016.

Walcott-Nolan won the 3000m in the European Athletics Team Championships (Poland) in March 2021. Walcott-Nolan won the 1500 metres race at the 2021 British Championships, and in July 2021 was officially named in the British squad for the delayed 2020 Summer Games in Tokyo.  In the Heats of the 1500m she came 7th, and missed out on a fastest loser place for the semi finals by 0.01 of a second.

References

External links
 

1995 births
Living people
British female middle-distance runners
Sportspeople from Luton
Alumni of St Mary's University, Twickenham
Athletes (track and field) at the 2020 Summer Olympics
British Athletics Championships winners
Olympic athletes of Great Britain